KRI Singa (651) is a FPB-57 Nav II patrol boat currently operated by the Indonesian Navy.

Service history 
Singa was built by Lürrsen-Werft, fitted out by PT PAL and launched in 1988. The ship was commissioned in 1988.

Appearance in Fiction

KRI Singa was shown as the ship used by the Indonesian Navy to try capturing Rocky in the film K.G.F: Chapter 2.

References

1988 ships
Patrol vessels of the Indonesian Navy
Naval ships of Indonesia